Glannau Penmon - Biwmares is a Site of Special Scientific Interest (or SSSI) in Anglesey, North Wales. It has been designated as a Site of Special Scientific Interest since January 1957 in an attempt to protect its fragile biological and geological elements.

Type and features
This SSSI has been notified as being of both geological and biological importance and the following are considered to be of Special Scientific Interest:

1. Communities of animals and plants of mixed sediment and of muddy gravel shores.
2.  Four communities of restricted national distribution:
  Piddocks burrowed into lower shore limestone overgrown with serrated wrack.
  Sponges, sea-squirts and serrated wrack on tide-swept lower shore rock.
  Sponges, sea-squirts, red seaweeds and serrated wrack found on a tideswept mixture of mud, sand, cobbles and pebbles.
  Lower shore muddy gravel inhabited by a diverse group of small marine
worms.
3.  Two species-rich communities of marine plants and animals:
  Sponges, sea-squirts and sea-mats on bedrock overhangs.
  Serrated wrack and various animals under lower shore boulders.
4.  A succession of ice-age sediments, exposed in the soft coastal cliffs and foreshore at Lleiniog

See also
List of Sites of Special Scientific Interest in Isle of Anglesey

References

External links
Natural Resources Wales website

Sites of Special Scientific Interest on Anglesey